Some Kind of Hero is a 1982 American comedy-drama film starring Richard Pryor as a returning Vietnam War veteran having trouble adjusting to civilian life. Soon he is involved in an organized crime heist. It co-stars Margot Kidder and was directed by Michael Pressman.

Although James Kirkwood and Robert Boris are jointly credited with the screenplay, the script was in fact Boris' rewrite of Kirkwood’s adaptation of his novel. Originally intended to be a straight drama, the studio insisted that Pryor perform comedic scenes as well. However, Pryor agreed with the importance of the screenplay's serious tone and maintained a dramatic performance when filming.

Plot
Eddie Keller is one of the last POWs to be brought home from Vietnam, after several years of torture and deprivation at the hands of the Vietcong. During his captivity, he resists signing a "confession" admitting to war crimes repeatedly, but finally consents to save the life of another prisoner.

Having returned home, Eddie finds the world has moved on without him.  His wife has fallen in love with someone new, and had a daughter, just after he became a POW.  His mother has suffered a stroke, and requires constant (and expensive) medical attention. Eddie is initially called a hero when he is finally released, but when his signed confession is discovered his veteran's benefits are suspended by the Veterans Administration pending further investigation.

Eddie tries to reintegrate into society, but finds himself stopped at every turn. The Army refuses to help, he cannot find a job, and he is running out of options. The only bright spot in his life is Toni, a high-priced prostitute who picks Eddie up at a bar.  Despite Toni's profession, the two begin a romance.

While trying to secure a loan, Eddie is witness to a bank robbery. He begins to plot a way to gain the funds he needs to provide for his mother, and also to avenge himself on a system that abandoned him in Vietnam, then turned him into a traitor.

Eddie plans to hold up a bank, but fails repeatedly in his efforts to embark on a life of crime.  Eventually, he succeeds in stealing a briefcase full of bonds, which he arranges to sell to a mobster for $100,000. The mobsters plan to kill Eddie and take the bonds.  Eddie turns the tables on the mobsters, leading to their arrest at his hotel.

Trapped, Eddie calls Toni, confessing to his crimes and tells her he'll turn himself in. She pleads with him to escape with her, and they confess their feelings for each other. As the police evacuate the building, Eddie decides to confront them in his Army uniform. Much to his surprise, the officers are very patriotic, and assume him to not be their suspect. He is then rushed away from the scene, where Toni arrives and picks him up with both the $100,000 and the bonds.

In one of the closing scenes, a bank employee is seen delivering a large envelope to a man in an office. The envelope has the bank's address and is marked as being for the attention of the bank's president. The man opens the package and finds the bonds that had been stolen from them, and a note from Pryor's character saying "Thanks for the loan".

Cast
Richard Pryor as Eddie Keller
Margot Kidder as Toni Donovan
Ray Sharkey as Vinnie
Ronny Cox as Col. Powers
Sandy Ward as Col. Maxwell
Lynne Moody as Lisa
Paul Benjamin as Leon
Olivia Cole as Jesse 
Martin Azarow as Tank
Shelly Batt as Olivia
Susan Berlin as Jeanette
Matt Clark as Mickey
John Fujioka as Captain Tan Tai
Peter Jason as Honcho #1
Herbie Braha as Honcho #2
Raymond Guth as Motel Clerk
Anne Haney as Monica Lewis
Mary Jackson as Frances
Caren Kaye as Sheila Daniels
Nan Martin as Hilda
Bill Morey as Major Ryan
Antony Ponzini as Sal
Jude Farese as Bandit
Warren Munson as Bank President
Kario Salem as Young Soldier
Jon Van Ness as Powers' Aide
Pearl Shear as Customer
David Byrd as Doorman
David Banks as Disc Jockey
Nicholas Mele as Officer
Harvey Parry as Old Drunk
Richard McKenzie as Psychiatrist
Danny Wong as Tough Guard

Production
The film had been in development for a number of years. Eventually Richard Pryor agreed to do it.

Reception

The film gained mixed reviews, feeling the comedy was subpar but praised the social commentary of Vietnam veterans feeling abandoned by society, and was a minor success at the box office.

See also
 List of American films of 1982

References

External links

1982 films
1982 comedy-drama films
American comedy-drama films
1980s English-language films
Films scored by Patrick Williams
Films directed by Michael Pressman
Films produced by Howard W. Koch
Paramount Pictures films
Vietnam War films
1982 comedy films
1982 drama films
1980s American films